Tyseley Locomotive Works, formerly the Birmingham Railway Museum, is the engineering arm of steam railtour promoter Vintage Trains based in Birmingham, England. It occupies part of the former Great Western Railway's Tyseley depot, built in 1908 to accommodate expanding operations in the West Midlands, particularly the opening of the North Warwickshire Line as a new main line from Birmingham to Bristol.

As well as supporting the trust's operating wing Vintage Trains, it is home to an extensive collection of steam engines, from small industrial builds to Great Western Railway 'Castles' and 'Halls', and large ex-mainline diesel engines.

Background

Following the purchase of GWR Castle Class No.7029 Clun Castle in January 1966 by Patrick Whitehouse, the locomotive needed a base close to its central West Midlands supporters' base. Whitehouse found space available at Tyseley, on the site of the former GWR depot, and formed 7029 Clun Castle Ltd to own both the locomotive and the rights to stable it at the depot.

In October 1968, 7029 Clun Castle Ltd purchased LMS Jubilee Class No.5593 "Kolhapur". With further locomotives and railway artefacts available as a result of the Beeching Axe, the supporters established the Standard Gauge Steam Trust as a registered educational charity, to preserve and demonstrate the steam locomotives. Following negotiations the trust acquired a long-term lease on a large part of the Tyseley site, and established the Tyseley Collection which still owns the locomotives and artefacts via the limited company; the depot site became the "Birmingham Railway Museum".

The trust cleared buildings and repaired the dilapidated tracks, and two water columns were repaired to allow steam locomotives to stay at the site. In 1968 the old coaling stage was converted into a two-road shed with an inspection pit to hold both acquired locomotives. In November 1966 Clun Castle was stripped and restored.

In 1999 the trust achieved its long-held objective of running a regular steam train service on the national main line railway network: the Shakespeare Express between Birmingham Snow Hill and Stratford-upon-Avon. At this point the trust felt that the term museum was inappropriate for its new status, and hence separated its assets and operations into two new organisations, Tyseley Locomotive Works and the operating arm Vintage Trains, with the third arm remaining the Tyseley Collection.

Shakespeare Express
As part of its educational programme the trust's operational arm Vintage Trains runs the Shakespeare Express between Birmingham Snow Hill and Stratford-upon-Avon.

In October 2004 the trust announced the acquisition of a site adjacent to Stratford-upon-Avon railway station for future use as the Stratford Railway Tourist Centre and Steam Locomotive Centre. This will provide a steam loco servicing centre at the southern end of the Shakespeare Line. A small museum is also being considered.

References

External links 

 
 Stock list

Railway depots in England
Heritage railways in the West Midlands (county)
Rail transport in Birmingham, West Midlands
Museums in Birmingham, West Midlands
Railway museums in England